German submarine U-40 was a Type IXA U-boat of Nazi Germany's Kriegsmarine that operated during World War II.

U-40 was built in Bremen by DeSchiMAG AG Weser as yard number 945. She was launched in November 1938 and commissioned in February 1939.

U-40 conducted two war patrols during her career. Both of which were part of the 6th U-boat Flotilla. During her short time in the war, she sank no ships.

U-40 was sunk on 13 October 1939 by a mine in the English Channel.

Construction

U-40 was ordered by the Kriegsmarine on 29 July 1936 (as part of Plan Z and in violation of the Treaty of Versailles). Her kneel was laid down on 1 July 1937. U-40 was launched on 9 November 1938 and commissioned on 11 February 1939 under the command of Kapitänleutnant Werner von Schmidt.

Design
As one of the eight original German Type IX submarines, later designated IXA, U-40 had a displacement of  when at the surface and  while submerged. She had two shafts and two  propellers.

U-40 was fitted with six  torpedo tubes (four fitted at the bow and two at the stern), 22 torpedoes, one  SK C/32 naval gun, 180 rounds, and a  SK C/30 as well as a  C/30 anti-aircraft gun. The boat had a complement of forty-eight.

Service history
After being commissioned and deployed, U-40 was stationed in the German port city of Wilhelmshaven, which to be her home for the rest of her fairly short career.

Patrols
U-40 left Wilhelmshaven on 19 August 1939, before World War II began, for her first patrol. For nearly four weeks she operated off the coast of Gibraltar, before returning home on 18 September that same year.
U-40 would once again leave Wilhelmshaven, this time under the command of Kapitänleutnant Wolfgang Barten, on 10 October 1939. During this patrol, she was to conduct joint operations off the coasts of Portugal and Spain.

Fate
She was to operate as part of the first pack of U-boats in World War II; however, because she left port late, Barten decided to take a shortcut to the U-boat's designated meeting point, southwest of Ireland. This shortcut was through the English Channel, which was festooned with many British naval mines. Choosing to make the voyage nearly three and a half hours after high tide, the mines were not at their lowest point. The boat struck one of these devices and sank immediately to the sea floor. Nevertheless, nine crew members were able to exit through the aft escape hatch. Using escape equipment, they were able to reach the surface; one of the nine died on his journey. Once there, five more died from exposure to the harsh elements of the English Channel.

References

Bibliography

External links

German Type IX submarines
U-boats commissioned in 1939
U-boats sunk in 1939
World War II submarines of Germany
World War II shipwrecks in the English Channel
Wreck diving sites in the United Kingdom
1938 ships
U-boats sunk by mines
Ships built in Bremen (state)
Maritime incidents in October 1939